2009 RR micro-asteroid, classified as near-Earth object of the Apollo group. It was discovered on 11 September 2009 by the Catalina Sky Survey at an apparent magnitude of 19.5 using a  Schmidt–Cassegrain telescope.  was the only asteroid discovered before 2014 that was predicted to potentially pass inside the orbit of the Moon during 2014. It is not large enough to qualify as a potentially hazardous object.

Description 

With an observation arc of only 4 days, the asteroid has a poorly determined orbit. It is already known that there is no risk of an Earth impact before 2098. The power of such an air burst would be somewhere between the Chelyabinsk meteor and the Tunguska event depending on the actual size of the asteroid.

On 9 September 2014 the full moon may have only be 15 degrees from the 20th magnitude asteroid, making it difficult to detect the asteroid. The asteroid was estimated to be brighter than magnitude 20 from 10 September until 16 September 2014.  was not recovered during the 2014 approach and thus probably passed more than one lunar distance from Earth.

References

External links 
 
 
 

Minor planet object articles (unnumbered)
Discoveries by the Catalina Sky Survey
Potential impact events caused by near-Earth objects
20140916
20090911